Sallehen bin Mukhyi is a Malaysian politician and served as Selangor State Executive Councillor.

Education 
Sallehen graduated from International Islamic University Malaysia with a Diploma of Education degree and a Bachelor of Islamic studies degree in Quran and Sunnah from National University of Malaysia. He also obtained a Master of Modern Language Studies  degree from the University of Malaya.

Election results

References 

Living people
1967 births
People from Selangor
Malaysian people of Malay descent
Malaysian Muslims
Malaysian Islamic Party politicians
Members of the Selangor State Legislative Assembly
Selangor state executive councillors
21st-century Malaysian politicians
University of Malaya alumni
National University of Malaysia alumni